James Gunn (March 6, 1843 – November 5, 1911) was a one-term U. S. Congressman from the state of Idaho.

Biography
Born in County Fermanagh, Ireland, Gunn emigrated to the United States with his parents while he was very young. The family settled in Wisconsin where he attended the common schools. James later attended the Notre Dame Academy in Indiana and taught school briefly before the Civil War.

In 1862, Gunn enlisted in the 27th Wisconsin Infantry and served with them for the remainder of the war. By the time he was discharged in October 1865, he was a Captain. He briefly studied law, but never practiced, and, in 1866, he headed west.

In the West, he followed opportunity and lived for a while in Gilpin County and Georgetown, Colorado. He also worked in Virginia City, Nevada, and in California before settling in Hailey, Idaho, in 1881. At Hailey, he went into the newspaper business, publishing the Wood River Valley Sentinel.

Gunn became a member of the Populist Party, and stood for office several times. When Idaho became a state in 1890, Gunn was elected to the Idaho State Senate.

He also served as editor of the Boise Sentinel until elected to the state's at-large seat in Congress.
Gunn ran for the seat four times; in 1892, 1894, 1896, and 1898, but only his 1896 race was successful. He defeated Boise attorney William Borah, who later served over 32 years as a U.S. Senator (1907–40). Gunn lost his bid for re-election in 1898 to Edgar Wilson, a Silver Republican, whom had preceded Gunn in office as a Republican.

Gunn later was the commandant of the Idaho Soldiers' Home in 1901–03. He died in 1911 and is buried at Morris Hill Cemetery in Boise.

References

External links
 Retrieved on 2008-11-05
South Fork Companion: James Gunn

1843 births
1911 deaths
People from County Fermanagh
Irish emigrants to the United States (before 1923)
People's Party members of the United States House of Representatives from Idaho
Idaho Populists
People from Boise, Idaho
Idaho state senators
Union Army officers
People of Wisconsin in the American Civil War
19th-century American politicians
Members of the United States House of Representatives from Idaho